Deaf Forever: The Best of Motörhead is a compilation album by the band Motörhead, released on 8 August 2000 on Castle Select Records.

Recording
The album compilation contains a modest amount of their more well-known Motörhead songs, while instead showcasing the more obscure fan-favorite songs. 
Also included is the Headgirl collaboration, a cover of "Please Don't Touch" by Johnny Kidd & the Pirates.

Track listing
All tracks composed by Eddie Clarke, Ian Kilmister and Phil Taylor, unless otherwise stated.

Personnel
Lemmy (Ian Kilmister) – bass, vocals
"Fast" Eddie Clarke – guitar
Phil "Philthy Animal" Taylor – drums
Phil "Wizzo" Campbell – guitar
Pete Gill – drums
Würzel – guitar
Ken Caliat – producer
John Trickett – producer
Randy Glenn – quality control
Janelle Guillot – voice-over
Melinda Pepler – production coordinator
Kristian Storli – authoring
Claus Trelby – engineer, audio supervisor
Charlie Watts – mastering
Chuck Ybarra – graphic design

Release history

References

2000 greatest hits albums
Motörhead compilation albums